Bernard Dafney (November 1, 1968 – January 11, 2006) was an American football offensive tackle. In 1992 Bernard was selected by the Houston Oilers in the 9th Round of the NFL Draft. Dafney's college years were spent at the University Of Tennessee Volunteers where he saw a good amount of playing time on the field. He played for the Houston Oilers, Minnesota Vikings, Arizona Cardinals, Pittsburgh Steelers and the Baltimore Ravens in a six-year career that lasted from 1992 to 1998 in the National Football League.

He died of a heart attack in Rockdale County, Georgia.

External links
https://web.archive.org/web/20110522151333/http://www.chattanoogan.com/articles/article_78654.asp

1968 births
2006 deaths
Players of American football from Los Angeles
American football offensive tackles
Tennessee Volunteers football players
Houston Oilers players
Minnesota Vikings players
Arizona Cardinals players
Pittsburgh Steelers players
Baltimore Ravens players